Dr. Joaquín García High School is a public high school located in Lake Worth, Florida, United States.

History
Dr. Joaquín García High School was established in 2023. The school is the first high school in Palm Beach County to be named after a Hispanic community leader. The school is named after Dr. Joaquín García, who is co-founder of the Hispanic Education Coalition, who died in December of 2021.

References

External links
 

Buildings and structures in Lake Worth Beach, Florida
High schools in Palm Beach County, Florida
Public high schools in Florida
Educational institutions established in 2023
2023 establishments in Florida